H.S. Skovoroda Kharkiv National Pedagogical University is a Ukrainian university in Kharkiv. It was founded in 1933.

On the territory of the university there was a monument to the Ukrainian philosopher Hryhorii Skovoroda, which was opened on September 28, 2012, and destroyed on the night of July 6, 2022 (around 00:15) as a result of a missile attack by the Russian army from Belgorod. The premises of Kharkiv National Pedagogical University named after H.S. Skovoroda were also destroyed. Three floors in the central building of the institution collapsed. Also, a 40-year-old watchman of the university died at the scene.

Campuses and buildings
Alchevskyh st., 29

Valentynivska st., 2 (destroyed by Russian shelling on 6 July 2022)
Chernyshevska st., 60
Faninskyi st., 3

Campus:
Faninskyi st., 3-V
Yuvileiniy Ave., 50
Hvardiitsіv Shironіntsіv st., 41-A
Liudviha Svobody Ave., 53-B

Institutes and faculties

1 Institute: Institute of Postgraduate Education and Management

10 Faculties: History and Law; Natural, special and health education; Ukrainian Language and Literature Faculty named after G.F. Kwitka-Osnovyanenko; Preschool education; Foreign Philology;  Arts; Primary education;  Social and Behavioral Sciences; Physical Education and Sports; Physics and Mathematics

References

External links
Official site

Educational institutions established in 1804
National universities in Ukraine
Universities and colleges in Kharkiv
1804 establishments in Ukraine
Teachers colleges